Cook House may refer to:

In the United States
(by state then city)
 Cook House (North Little Rock, Arkansas), NHRP # 93001250
 John Cook House, New Haven, Connecticut, listed on the National Register of Historic Places (NRHP)
 William H. Cook Water Tank House, Jerome, Idaho, listed on the NRHP
 John W. Cook Hall, Normal, Illinois, listed on the NRHP
 Cook Farm (Charles City, Iowa), listed on the NRHP
 Clarissa Cook Home for the Friendless, Davenport, Iowa, listed on the NRHP
 Cook House (Alexandria, Louisiana), NHRP # 79001086
 William Cook House (Cambridge, Massachusetts), listed on the NRHP
 Whitney-Farrington-Cook House, Waltham, Massachusetts, listed on the NRHP
 Asa M. Cook House, Reading, Massachusetts, listed on the NRHP
 Thomas Cook House (Somerville, Massachusetts), listed on the NRHP
 A. E. Cook House, Uxbridge, Massachusetts, listed on the NRHP
 Cook-Sellers House, DeSoto, Mississippi, listed on the NRHP in Mississippi
 Cook House (Hazlehurst, Mississippi), NHRP # 83003941
 Cook Farm (Missoula, Montana), listed on the NRHP in Missoula County
 Harold J. Cook Homestead Cabin, Agate, Nebraska, listed on the NRHP
 Will Marion Cook House, New York, New York, listed on the NRHP
 William Cook House (Mebane, North Carolina), listed on the NRHP
 John Cook Farm, Harlem, Ohio, listed on the NRHP in Delaware County
 Unzicker-Cook House, Oxford, Ohio, listed on the NRHP
 Shipley-Cook Farmstead, Lake Oswego, Oregon, listed on the NRHP in Clackamas County
 Cook-Bateman Farm, Tiverton, Rhode Island, listed on the NRHP
 Fox-Cook Farm, Wallingford, Vermont, listed on the NRHP
 Cook House (Parkersburg, West Virginia), listed on the NHRPin Wood County (#78002812)
 Thomas Cook House (Milwaukee, Wisconsin), NRHP-listed

See also
Cookhouse, a small building where cooking takes place
Cook Farm (disambiguation)
Thomas Cook House (disambiguation)
William Cook House (disambiguation)
Cooke House (disambiguation)
Cookhouse, Eastern Cape